Wildhorse Peak is a  mountain summit located in Ouray County, of Colorado, United States. It is situated five miles east of the community of Ouray, in the Uncompahgre Wilderness, on land managed by Uncompahgre National Forest. It is part of the San Juan Mountains which are a subset of the Rocky Mountains, and is situated west of the Continental Divide. Neighbors include Darley Mountain 2.2 miles to the south, and Abrams Mountain five miles to the southwest. The peak can be seen from Montrose and Highway 550. The first ascent of the summit was made August 25, 1899, by Eli Stanton, F. H. Stanton, and William Killen. The mountain's name, which has been officially adopted by the United States Board on Geographic Names, was in use in 1906 when Henry Gannett published it in A Gazetteer of Colorado.

Climate 
According to the Köppen climate classification system, Wildhorse Peak is located in an alpine subarctic climate zone with cold, snowy winters, and cool to warm summers. Due to its altitude, it receives precipitation all year, as snow in winter, and as thunderstorms in summer, with a dry period in late spring. Precipitation runoff from the mountain drains into headwaters of Wildhorse Creek and Cow Creek, which are tributaries of the Uncompahgre River.

Gallery

See also

References

External links 

 Weather forecast: Wildhorse Peak

Mountains of Ouray County, Colorado
San Juan Mountains (Colorado)
Mountains of Colorado
North American 4000 m summits
Uncompahgre National Forest